Paralygdamia madagascariensis is a species of praying mantis native to Madagascar.

See also
List of mantis genera and species

References

Tarachodidae
Mantodea of Africa
Insects of Madagascar
Insects described in 1839